is a city located in Nagasaki Prefecture, Japan, on the northern tip of Shimabara Peninsula, facing Ariake Bay in the east and Mount Unzen to the south. The total area is 206.92 km².

History
The modern city of Unzen was established on October 11, 2005, from the merger of the towns of Aino, Azuma, Chijiwa, Kunimi, Minamikushiyama, Mizuho and Obama (all from Minamitakaki District).

Climate

Tourism
Obama Onsen is located in Unzen City. The poet Saito Mokichi wrote a verse about the beauty of this hot spring.

References

External links

  

Cities in Nagasaki Prefecture